Natalie Margaret Neaton (born May 24, 1974) is an American former soccer player who played as a forward. She made six appearances for the United States women's national team between 1995 and 1998, and is a member of the William & Mary Athletic Hall of Fame.

Career
Neaton played for the Detroit Country Day Yellowjackets in high school, scoring 222 goals in four seasons, three shy of the national record. She was also an All-State basketball player for the Yellowjackets. In college, she played for the William & Mary Tribe. In total, she scored 81 goals and recorded 28 assists during her career with the Tribe, making her the school's record goalscorer. She also has the second most career points (goals and assists) for the school, with 190. She was ISAA Player of the Year in 1995, NSCAA and Soccer America First-Team All-American in 1994, and NSCAA Second-Team All-American in 1992, 1993, and 1995. She was included in the Soccer America All-Rookie Team in 1992, and was a finalist for the Hermann Trophy in 1994.

Neaton made her international debut for the United States on January 23, 1995 in a friendly match against Australia. In total, she made six appearances for the U.S. and scored four goals, earning her final cap on December 16, 1998 in a friendly match against Ukraine.

Neaton later played club soccer in Japan for two years, having received multiple offers from Japanese teams to join once she graduated from college. She was inducted into the William & Mary Athletic Hall of Fame in 2008.

Personal life
Neaton, a native of Brighton, Michigan, now resides in Denver. She has three sons with her husband Jim Simpson.

Career statistics

International

International goals

References

1974 births
Living people
People from Brighton, Michigan
Sportspeople from Metro Detroit
Soccer players from Michigan
American women's soccer players
United States women's international soccer players
American expatriate women's soccer players
American expatriate sportspeople in Japan
Expatriate footballers in Japan
Women's association football forwards
Detroit Country Day School alumni
William & Mary Tribe women's soccer players